The Silverton Northern Railroad, now defunct, was an American  Narrow Gauge Railroad constructed to reach the mining area north of Silverton, Colorado along the upper Animas River. This line was the third railroad project built by known Colorado toll road builder and Russian Immigrant Otto Mears, beginning in 1889 as a branch of the Silverton Railroad to Eureka.  Incorporated in 1895 as the Silverton Northern Railroad, the line was projected to run past Eureka to Animas Forks and on to Mineral Point and then on to Lake City via Henson Creek, including a proposed three-quarter-mile tunnel through the mountains.  However, Animas Forks was the end of the line, which was reached in 1896.

Operations on the line were seasonal, due to the tremendous amount of snowfall that was typical in the San Juan region. The Silverton Railroad and the Silverton Northern while never officially merged, were operated as one entity, sharing rolling stock and motive power. In 1915, the Silverton, Gladstone and Northerly Railroad built by the Gold King Mine, was purchased by Mears, becoming the SN's Gladstone Branch.

The railroad managed to survive bad weather and fluctuating metals markets for years, the Silverton Railroad being dismantled in 1926 after several years of inactivity, and the main line was cut back from Animas Forks to Eureka in the late 1930s.  Finally, in 1942, while the mines were idle and US involvement in World War II was increasing, the remaining SN equipment was requisitioned by the US Army for use on the White Pass and Yukon Route during the hurried construction of the Alaska Highway, and the rails were torn up for scrap.

The San Juan County Historical Society is planning on rebuilding the section between Silverton and Howardsville.

Roster

References

External links

Visit the Silverton Northern Railroad Reconstruction Project: http://www.silvertonnorthern.com

Defunct Colorado railroads
3 ft gauge railways in the United States
Narrow gauge railroads in Colorado
Narrow gauge railroads in Ouray County, Colorado
Transportation in San Juan County, Colorado
Closed railway lines in the United States